Yu Yifu (May 19, 1903 – June 11, 1982), original name Yu Chengze, was a People's Republic of China politician. He was born in Shuangchengbao, Jilin Province. He attended Tongji University. He was governor of Heilongjiang Province.

1903 births
1982 deaths
People's Republic of China politicians from Jilin
Chinese Communist Party politicians from Jilin
Governors of Heilongjiang
Tongji University alumni